The Blériot XLIII was a First World War French reconnaissance plane designed and built by Blériot.

Design
The crew was located in the cabin in a tandem scheme. At the observer at the bottom of the window was added, providing a good overview. The Bleriot XLIII was a double mid-plane with a monocoque-type fuselage, equipped with an 80 hp Gnome 7A engine.

Development 
In March 1913, Louise Bleriot built the Bleriot XLIII a further development of the Bleriot XXXVI. The Bleriot XLIII could be used for long-distance reconnaissance, but mediocre flight characteristics did not allow Bleriot to conclude a contract for its mass production.

Specifications

References

Further reading
 

1910s French military reconnaissance aircraft
XLIII
Monoplanes
Aircraft first flown in 1913
Rotary-engined aircraft